Maximilian Werda (born 5 October 1991 in Kaulsdorf) is a German cyclist.

Palmares
2013
2nd U23 National Road Race Championships
3rd Eschborn-Frankfurt City Loop U23
2014
1st Overall Tour of Malopolska
1st Stages 2 & 3
5th Overall Istrian Spring Trophy

References

1991 births
Living people
German male cyclists
People from Saalfeld-Rudolstadt
Cyclists from Thuringia
21st-century German people